Dino De Antoni (12 July 1936 – 22 March 2019) was an Italian Roman Catholic archbishop.

De Antoni was born in Italy and was ordained to the priesthood in 1960. He served as archbishop of the Roman Catholic Archdiocese of Gorizia, Italy from 1999 to 2012.

Notes

1936 births
2019 deaths
Italian Roman Catholic archbishops
Roman Catholic archbishops of Gorizia